This article lists open, former and demolished places of worship situated within the boundaries of the City of Leeds.

Open places of worship

Aberford

Adel

Allerton Bywater

Alwoodley

Armley

Arthington

Bardsey

Barwick-in-Elmet

Beeston

Belle Isle

Boston Spa

Bramham

Bramhope

Bramley

Burley

Burmantofts

Calverley

Chapel Allerton

Chapeltown

City Centre

Clifford

Collingham

Colton

Cookridge

Cottingley

Cross Gates

Cross Green

Drighlington

East End Park

East Keswick

Farnley

Farsley

Fulneck

Garforth

Gildersome

Gipton

Guiseley

Halton

Halton Moor

Harehills

Hawksworth (LS5)

Hawksworth (LS20)

Headingley

Holbeck

Horsforth

Hunslet

Hyde Park

Ireland Wood

Killingbeck

Kirkstall

Kippax

Lincoln Green

Little London

Mabgate

Meanwood

Methley

Micklefield

Middleton

Moortown and Moor Allerton

Morley

New Farnley

Osmondthorpe

Otley

Oulton

Pool-in-Wharfedale

Potternewton

Pudsey

Rawdon

Richmond Hill

Rothwell

Roundhay

Scholes

Scott Hall

Seacroft

Shadwell

Sheepscar

Stanningley

Swarcliffe

Swillington

Swinnow

Thorner

Thorp Arch

Tingley

Walton

Weetwood

West Park

Wetherby

Whinmoor

Whitkirk

Woodhouse

Woodlesford

Wortley

Yeadon

Former places of worship

Aberford

Adel

Alwoodley

Armley

Bardsey

Barwick-in-Elmet

Beeston

Bramham

Burley

Burmantofts

Carlton, near Rawdon

Carlton, near Rothwell

Chapeltown

City Centre

Cross Gates

East Keswick

Farsley

Garforth

Gipton

Harehills

Harewood

Headingley

Holbeck

Horsforth

Kirkstall

Meanwood

Middleton

Moortown

Morley

New Farnley

Otley

Pudsey

Rawdon

Richmond Hill

Rodley

Roundhay

Seacroft

Shadwell

Sheepscar

Stanningley

Swarcliffe

Temple Newsam

Thorner

Tingley

Weardley

Wetherby

Whinmoor

Woodhouse

Yeadon

Demolished places of worship

Adel
Remains of Roman tombstones and altars have been found near Adel Mill along Roman road 72b, which ran from Ilkley to Tadcaster. An altar dedicated to Brigantia and a stone slab with an inscription surrounding a phallus are both preserved in Adel parish church.

Alwoodley

Armley

Arthington

Beeston
There was a chapel in Beeston with an anchorite cell attached, built before 1257.

Belle Isle

Bramhope
The original Methodist chapel in Bramhope was built in 1837, near to the site of the current church, which replaced it in 1896.

Bramley

Burley

Burmantofts

Buslingthorpe
The Church of St Michael was built in 1852–1854 on Buslingthorpe Lane and demolished in the late 1950s or early 1960s. The architect was O. W. Burleigh, of Leeds. The church was located at the western (Woodhouse Carr) end of Buslingthorpe Lane.

Chapel Allerton

Chapeltown

City centre

Clifford

Cross Gates

Eccup
Kelly's Directory of the West Riding of Yorkshire (1881) refers to a Methodist (Wesleyan) chapel in Eccup.

Farsley
Mediaeval Wadlands Hall, Priesthorpe Road, now the location of Wadlands Farm and Wadlands Cottage, had its own private chapel and chaplain. The field "Chapel Ing" commemorates this chapel, and it is possible that the name "Priesthorpe" is so called from the priest at the hall.

Guiseley
Leeds City Council's Conservation Area Appraisal and Management Plan for Guiseley notes that "a number of fragments from a 9th century Anglo-Saxon cross were discovered reused in the north wall of St Oswald’s Church. The remains of the cross and the dedication to an early saint may be evidence of a preconquest church at Guiseley."

Halton

Harehills

Harewood

Holbeck

Horsforth

Hunslet

Kippax

Leylands, The

Little London

Merrion Centre

Moortown

Newsam Green
Archaeologists believe that there may have been a chapel at the Temple Newsam Preceptory, south east of Temple Newsam House, a few yards to the south-east of junction 45 of the M1 motorway. Excavations in 1903 found human remains, stone coffins and a possible chapel, but a rescue dig in 1989-1991 failed to find the chapel, which was surmised to be under an industrial spoil heap to the south. The Gatehouse Gazetteer refers to "the area immediately north of the chapel", which had been disturbed by animal burials before the 1989-1991 excavation.

Otley

Pool-in-Wharfedale

Quarry Hill

Richmond Hill

Roundhay

The first post-Reformation Catholic church in Leeds was the Roundhay Mission.

Rothwell

Scarcroft
A Roman altar has been identified near Milner Beck in Scarcroft.

Shadwell

Sheepscar

Stourton

Swillington
The Doomsday Book states that 'a church is there', but no record of that building now remains.

Thorpe Park
Northern Archaeological Associates make reference to an altar of Iron Age or Roman origin at Grim's Ditch, part of an archaeological site investigated as part of the Thorpe Park commercial development.

Wetherby

Woodhouse

Wortley

Yeadon

Major sources
The following sources provide much of the detail used here:
Minnis, John, (2007) Religion and Place in Leeds English Heritage  (Architecture and dates)
British Listed Buildings  (Grades)
Mosques in Leeds  (Mosques, current and past)
GENUKI The Ancient Parish of Leeds  (Historical information on churches)
Leodis - a photographic archive of Leeds  (Leeds Library and Information Service)

See also
Architecture of Leeds
List of churches in the Anglican Diocese of Leeds
List of places of worship in the City of Wakefield

References

 
Places of worship
Leeds
Leeds, City of